Harry Erwin Bard (August 27, 1867 - July 13, 1955) was secretary of the Pan American Society of the United States. He was also an author on education specializing in South America.

Biography
He was born on August 27, 1867 in Montgomery County, Indiana. He died in 1955 in New York.

Publications
Intellectual and Cultural Relations between the United States and the other Republics of America (1914)
South America (1916)
The City School District (1909)

References

1867 births
1955 deaths
American education writers
Pan-Americanism